() is a subsidiary of Italian holding company Ferrovie dello Stato. The company was created to redevelop and manage 103 medium-sized Italian railway stations.

History
A private consortium (Archimede) acquired a 40% stake in 2002. The shareholders in Archimede are Società Aeroporto di Venezia S.p.A. with 40.5%, Manutencoop S.c.a.r.l. with 40.5%, Investimenti Immobiliari Lombardi S.p.A. with 15%, and Pulitori ed Affini S.p.A. with 4%.

List of Centostazioni stations by region

Abruzzo
 Chieti
 L'Aquila
 Pescara Centrale

Apulia
 Barletta
 Brindisi
 Foggia
 Lecce
 Taranto

Basilicata
 Potenza Centrale

Calabria
 Catanzaro Lido
 Reggio di Calabria Centrale
 Villa San Giovanni

Campania
 Benevento
 Caserta
 Napoli Campi Flegrei
 Napoli Mergellina
 Salerno

Emilia-Romagna
 Cesena
 Faenza
 Ferrara
 Forlì
 Modena
 Parma
 Piacenza
 Ravenna
 Reggio Emilia
 Rimini

Friuli-Venezia Giulia
 Gorizia Centrale
 Monfalcone
 Pordenone
 Trieste Centrale
 Udine

Lazio
 Civitavecchia
 Formia
 Orte
 Roma Ostiense
 Roma Trastevere

Liguria
 Chiavari
 Genova Sampierdarena
 Imperia Porto Maurizio
 La Spezia Centrale
 Rapallo
 Sanremo
 Savona
 Ventimiglia

Lombardy
 Bergamo
 Brescia
 Como San Giovanni
 Cremona
 Desenzano sul Garda-Sirmione
 Gallarate
 Lecco
 Lodi
 Mantova
 Milano Lambrate
 Milano Porta Garibaldi
 Milano Rogoredo
 Monza
 Pavia
 Sondrio
 Treviglio Centrale
 Varese
 Voghera

Marche
 Ancona
 Ascoli Piceno
 Macerata
 Pesaro

Molise
 Campobasso
 Termoli

Piedmont
 Alessandria
 Asti
 Biella San Paolo
 Cuneo
 Domodossola
 Novara
 Verbania-Pallanza
 Vercelli

Sardinia
 Cagliari

Sicily
 Catania Centrale
 Messina Centrale
 Messina Marittima

Tuscany
 Arezzo
 Grosseto
 Livorno Centrale
 Lucca
 Massa Centro
 Pisa Centrale
 Pistoia
 Prato Centrale
 Siena

Trentino-Alto Adige/Südtirol
 Bolzano
 Rovereto
 Trento

Umbria
 Assisi
 Foligno
 Perugia
 Terni

Aosta Valley
 Aosta

Veneto
 Belluno
 Castelfranco Veneto
 Padova
 Rovigo
 Treviso Centrale
 Vicenza

See also

Grandi Stazioni
Rete Ferroviaria Italiana

External links
 Official website of Centostazioni 

This article is based upon a translation from the Italian language version as at June 2010.

Ferrovie dello Stato Italiane
Railway companies of Italy
Railway companies established in 2001
Companies based in Rome
Railway stations in Italy